Baksara or Baksarah is a village of Ghazipur, Uttar Pradesh, India. Baksara village was established by Kamsar Pathans but later most of them migrated from Baksara to Gorasara and Mania village.

Histrorical Population

References

Villages in Ghazipur district